Tom McGee Moran (December 10, 1899 – July 4, 1933) was an American football blocking back who played one season with the New York Giants of the National Football League. He played college football at Centre College and attended Horse Cave High School in Horse Cave, Kentucky. His father, Charley Moran, was a Major League Baseball player and college football coach.

Prior to his playing career in the NFL, he was a coach at Carson–Newman University in Jefferson City, Tennessee, and he also served as short time as the interim coach of the Frankford Yellow Jackets while his father, Charley Moran, officiated the 1927 World Series.

Moran died of a self-inflicted gunshot wound to the chest at his home in Horse Cave, Kentucky on July 4, 1933. He had been in ill health for several years.

References

External links
 Just Sports Stats
 

1899 births
1933 deaths
Carson–Newman Eagles football coaches
Centre Colonels football players
Frankford Yellow Jackets coaches
New York Giants players
People from Hart County, Kentucky
Players of American football from Nashville, Tennessee
Players of American football from Kentucky
Suicides by firearm in Kentucky